TOI-1478 b is an exoplanet that was discovered by TESS in January 2021. It has an orbital period of 10.2 days and is 499 light years away from Earth.

References 

Exoplanets discovered in 2021
Exoplanets discovered by TESS